Luisito "Bodjie" Pascua (born March 2, 1955) is a Filipino stage and film & TV actor and former children's television host. He is best known as "Kuya Bodjie" ("Big Brother Bodjie"), the iconic character he portrayed on the children's educational television program Batibot.

On Batibot, Kuya Bodjie interacted with the other Batibot characters as part of the show's regular portion.  Pascua's unique claim to fame, however, was a segment called "Mga Kwento ni Kuya Bodjie" ("Kuya Bodjie's stories") which featured Pascua telling a new short Children's story in every episode.  Pascua called on his theater skills to make the narration lively and to give each character in the stories their own unique voice.

Pascua's stage appearances include Cabaret, Fire, Water, Woman, Mass, 1896, Zarzuela, Battalia Royale, and Hamlet, as well as numerous musicals written by composer Ryan Cayabyab such as Noli Me Tángere.

His film appearances include: Imahenasyon, Sa Aking Pagkakagising Mula Sa Kamulatan, The Blossoming of Maximo Oliveros (local title "Ang Pagdadalaga Ni Maximo Oliveros"), and the satiric mockumentary Coup B'Etat.

In popular culture
The iconic status of the Kuya Bodjie character has linked him and his distinctive voice to the childhood memories of the generation of Filipino children who grew up during the late 1980s.  Jokes and anecdotes about that period often involve a reference to the character, with the speaker imitating Pascua's signature vocalization, or that of other Batibot characters, such as Kiko Matsing or Pong Pagong, speaking to their "Kuya Bodjie".

Filmography

Television
Batibot (RPN 9, PTV 4, ABS-CBN 2, & GMA 7)Batang Batibot (GMA 7)
GMA Telecine Specials (GMA 7)
Love Notes (TV5)It Might Be You (ABS-CBN 2)Gimik (ABS-CBN 2)
Pahina (ABS-CBN 2)
 Epol/Apple (ABS-CBN 2)
 Sineskwela (ABS-CBN 2)
Wansapanataym (ABS-CBN 2)
Art Angel (GMA 7)- guest 
Maynila (GMA 7)
Magpakailanman (GMA 7)
Maalaala Mo Kaya: Kwintas (ABS-CBN 2)
Star Confessions (TV5)
Precious Hearts Romance Presents: Bud Brothers (ABS-CBN 2)
Your Song Presents: Million Miles Away (ABS-CBN 2)
I Dare You (ABS-CBN 2)
My Beloved (GMA 7)
Broken Vow (GMA 7)
Precious Hearts Romances Presents: Paraiso (ABS-CBN 2)
Be Careful With My Heart (ABS-CBN 2)
The Ryzza Mae Show(GMA 7)- guest
Agos (Knowledge Channel)
Moon of Desire (ABS-CBN 2)
Kuwentong K-buhayan (Knowledge Channel)
Elemento (GMA 7)
Nathaniel (ABS-CBN 2)
Wattpad Presents (TV5)
Oh My G! (ABS-CBN 2)
Tunay Na Buhay (GMA 7)
Sabado Badoo (GMA 7)
Ang Panday (TV5)
Tsuperhero (GMA 7)                                                                                                                                        
Wildflower (ABS-CBN 2)                                                                                              
Daig Kayo ng Lola Ko  (GMA 7)                                                                                                                 
Tadhana (GMA 7)
Starla (ABS-CBN 2)
24/7 (ABS-CBN 2)  
2 Good 2 Be True (Kapamilya Channel)
Mga Kwentong Epik (TV5)
Love You Stranger (GMA 7)
Mano Po Legacy: The Flower Sisters (GMA 7, 2022)

Film

Awards and recognition
Winner, Best Children's Program Host For Batibot'' - PMPC Star Awards For TV 1987

References

Filipino television personalities
Living people
1955 births
Filipino male stage actors
ABS-CBN personalities
GMA Network personalities
TV5 (Philippine TV network) personalities
New York University alumni